Mannin Maindhan is a 2005 Indian Tamil language action comedy film, directed by Rama Narayanan, starring Sibiraj and Adhu fame Suha. Sathyaraj plays a cameo role. The film, a remake of the Telugu film Yagnam, was released on 4 March 2005.

Plot
Bhairavamurthy (Manoj K. Jayan) and Gajapathy (Ponnambalam) are two powerful landlords who fight against each other in their village. Bhairavamurthy's wife and car driver got killed by Gajapathy's henchmen in the past, then Kadhir (Sibiraj), the car driver's son, decided to take revenge on Gajapathy one day and grew up in Bhairavamurthy's house. Amutha (Suha), Bhairavamurthy's daughter, returns to her village after studying in the city college and then falls in love with Kadhir. Bhairavamurthy decides to join hands with Gajapathy and to kill his faithful henchman Kadhir. The couple elopes from the house and runs around the village. Pratap (Sathyaraj), an honest cop, saves them. The henchmen, who worked with the landlords, lay down their arms and support the couple. Bhairavamurthy and Gajapathy decide to both kill Kadhir, but they eventually kill each other.

Cast

 Sibiraj as Kathir
 Suha as Amudha
 Manoj K. Jayan as Bhairavamurthy
 Ponnambalam as Gajapathy
 Alex as Handicap
 Vadivelu as 'Quarter' Vadivelu
 Suman Setty as Dheena
 Bala Singh as Joseph
 Indhu as Joseph's wife
 Kumarimuthu as Police Constable
 Thyagu as Police Constable
 Sathyaraj as Pratap (cameo appearance)
 Dharmavarapu Subramanyam as Raghavan (guest appearance)

Soundtrack

The film score and the soundtrack were composed by Bharadwaj. The soundtrack, released in 2005, features 5 tracks with lyrics written by Karunanidhi, Vaali, Vairamuthu, Na. Muthukumar and Snehan. Indiaglitz.com said : "Bharadwaj's music is very flat with none of the song sounding impressive".

Reception
R. Ashok Kumar of The Hindu wrote that "Both Sathyaraj and Sibi have shown that they at home in both pathos and action sequences". Indiaglitz.com stating that the film was "more dusty than being earthy".

References

External links

2005 films
Tamil remakes of Telugu films
2000s Tamil-language films
Films directed by Rama Narayanan
Films with screenplays by M. Karunanidhi
Films scored by Bharadwaj (composer)